The Encyclopédie nouvelle, ou dictionnaire philosophique, scientifique, littéraire et industriel, offrant le tableau des connaissances humaines au XIXe siècle was a French encyclopedia founded by Pierre Leroux and Jean Reynaud and published in installments from 1834 through 1847. It reflected the socialist philosophy of the founders.

Volume 1 (with an imprint of 1836, though the first installment appeared in 1834) covered A-Ari; volume 2, Ari-Bos; volume 3, Bot-Cons; volume 4, Const-Épic; and volume 8, Sap-Zor. Volumes 5 through 7 were never finished as planned, but materials issued in installments and intended for these volumes were eventually bound together in a miscellaneous volume covering the sequences Episc-Force and Organog-Phil.

Bibliography

 Marisa Forcina, I diritti dell’esistente : la filosofia della "Encyclopédie nouvelle" (1833-1847), Lecce: Milella, 1987.

External links
 Sulle tracce di Descartes: l’enciclopedia sintetica del XIX secolo; L’Encyclopédie Nouvelle di Leroux e Reynaud (in Italian)

Nouvelle (Leroux, 1939)
1834 non-fiction books
19th-century encyclopedias